Tiyeh (also Romanized as Tīyeh) is a village in Khorgam Rural District, Khorgam District, Rudbar County, Gilan Province, Iran. At the 2006 census, its population was 109, in 29 families.

References 

Populated places in Rudbar County